Claude Edward Riley Jr (born September 8, 1960) is an American retired professional basketball player.

College career
Riley played in the NCAA, with the Texas A&M Aggies.

Professional career
Riley was drafted by the NBA's Philadelphia 76ers, with the 64th pick of the 1983 NBA Draft, but he never played in the NBA. He played professionally in Spain and Italy.

Teams
1979–83: Texas A&M Aggies (NCAA)
1983–84: Cottorella Rieti (Italy)
1984–87: CAI Zaragoza (Spain)
1987–88: Spondilatte Cremona (Italy)
1988–90: RCD Espanyol (Spain)
1990–93: CB Breogán (Spain)
1993–94: CB Málaga (Spain)
1994–95: CB Salamanca (Spain)

Personal
Born in Crockett, Texas, Riley currently lives in Houston.

References
 ACB Profile 

1960 births
Living people
American expatriate basketball people in Italy
American expatriate basketball people in Spain
American men's basketball players
Baloncesto Málaga players
Basketball players from Texas
CB Breogán players
Centers (basketball)
Liga ACB players
People from Crockett, Texas
Philadelphia 76ers draft picks
Texas A&M Aggies men's basketball players